John Levy (April 11, 1912 – January 20, 2012) was an American jazz double-bassist and businessman.

Life
Levy was born in New Orleans, Louisiana.  In 1944, he left his family home in Chicago, Illinois, and moved to New York City where he played bass for such jazz musicians as Ben Webster, Erroll Garner, Milt Jackson, and Billie Holiday.  In 1949, he became the bassist in the original George Shearing Quintet, where he also acted as Shearing's road manager.  In 1951, Levy opened John Levy Enterprises, Inc., becoming the first African-American personal manager in the pop or jazz music field.  By the 1960s, Levy's client roster included Shearing, Nancy Wilson, Cannonball Adderley, Joe Williams, Shirley Horn, Soul singer Jimmie Raye, and Ramsey Lewis.

In 1997, Levy was inducted into the International Jazz Hall of Fame, and in 2006 he was named a Jazz Master by the National Endowment for the Arts.

He died on January 20, 2012, aged 99, in Altadena, California.

References

External links
Lushlife: "Virtual Home" of John Levy
Biography "Men, Women, and Girl Singers" on Snap Sizzle Bop!
Listing on National Endowment for the Arts Jazz Masters Fellowships
Interview with All About Jazz

Interview for the Smithsonian Institution

1912 births
2012 deaths
African-American musicians
Jazz musicians from New Orleans
Mainstream jazz double-bassists
Musicians from Chicago
Jazz musicians from Illinois
20th-century African-American people
21st-century African-American people